Cranston Academy: Monster Zone (formerly Scary Show) is an animated horror-comedy film directed by Leopoldo Aguilar. Produced by Ánima and Prime Focus World, the film is directed by Leopoldo Aguilar and features the voices of Jamie Bell and Ruby Rose.

The film was first released in Portugal on 12 March 2020, and later in Mexico on 26 June that year, featuring the Spanish voices of Polo Morín, Natalia Téllez, and Edson Zuñiga. The film was later released in the U.S. by Grindstone Entertainment, under the title Monster Zone.

Premise
A maverick 15-year-old high school student, Danny, is transferred to a secret boarding school where he opens a portal of monsters from the fifth dimension. To save the school from havoc of the monsters, he must work with his more-successful rival, Liz, and their moth-human hybrid professor.

Voice cast

Spanish
Polo Morín as Danny
Natalia Téllez as Liz
Edson Zuñiga as Hombre Polilla (Mothman)

English
Jamie Bell as Danny
Ruby Rose as Liz
Idzi Dutkiewicz as Mothman

Development
Bob Barlen and Cal Brunker have been attached to write the film's screenplay. The pair have previously written and directed films such as Escape from Planet Earth and The Nut Job 2: Nutty by Nature. The film's animation is handled by DNEG and Prime Focus World.

Casting
On 1 November 2019, British actor, Jamie Bell, and Australian actress, Ruby Rose have joined the film's lead voice cast. Jason Moring, the CEO of Double Dutch International, has stated that, "[we're] big fans of Jamie and Ruby. They're incredible actors with a truly wide inclusive fan base." For the Spanish dubbed version, telenovela actor Polo Morín, television host Natalia Téllez, and comedian Edson Zuñiga have lend their voices in the lead roles.

Release
The film was initially planned for release on 1 November 2019 in Mexico, but has been postponed. It was first released in theaters in Portugal on 12 March 2020. It was eventually released in Mexico on 26 June 2020, distributed by Videocine and titled Escuela de miedo ("School of Fear" in Spanish).

Awards and nominations

References

External links

2020 computer-animated films
2020 comedy horror films
2020 films
Ánima Estudios films
Mexican animated films
Mexican children's films
British 3D films
British computer-animated films
British children's animated films
British children's comedy films
Canadian 3D films
Canadian animated feature films
American animated feature films
2020s British animated films
Spanish-language Canadian films
2020s English-language films
2020s Canadian films
2020s American films
2020s British films